The 1972 Prague Skate was a senior international figure skating competition held 11–12 November 1972 in Czechoslovakia. Medals were awarded in the disciplines of men's singles and ladies' singles. Gold in both categories went to skaters from the United States. Future Olympic champion Dorothy Hamill won the ladies' title ahead of West Germany's Gerti Schanderl and Canada's Daria Prychun. Gordon McKellen took the men's title while Zdeněk Pazdírek of Czechoslovakia and Jacques Mrozek of France took silver and bronze, respectively.

Results

Men

Ladies

References

Rude Pravo Archiv, 13.11.1972, Page 8

1972
1972 in Czechoslovakia
Prague